Taylors College is a provider of university preparation programs in Australia and New Zealand. Established in Melbourne, Australia in 1920, Taylors College is a private school that  provides secondary school education (Year 10 - Year 12) and specialised University Foundation programs in partnership with universities in Australia and New Zealand. The college has campuses in Sydney and Auckland. It is a part of Study Group, a provider of private Higher Education, language and Careers Education, with nearly 200 university partnerships across the United States, Canada, the United Kingdom and Europe, Australia and New Zealand.

History 
George Taylor and Staff (GT&S) was established in 1920. It was one of 13 colleges that offered tuition to students at the University of Melbourne.

In the 50 years between 1920 and 1970, Taylors College provided about 320,000 students with access to further educational and employment opportunities.

Programs

University Foundation & University Diploma Programs
Diploma of Commerce

On successful completion of the Diploma students will gain guaranteed entry into second year of Bachelor of Commerce at The University of Western Australia.

The University of Sydney Foundation Program

Upon successful completion of this program, students will gain guaranteed entry into Australia's university - The University of Sydney

The University of Western Australia Foundation Program

The University of Western Australia Foundation Program is an academic program designed to prepare students for entry into the University of Western Australia. Students will gain guaranteed entry into the university upon successful completion of the program.

Taylors Auckland Foundation Year

The Taylors Auckland Foundation Year is stated by the college to be an assured pathway for entry into the University of Auckland, Auckland University of Technology and Massey University in New Zealand.

High School programs (Years 10, 11, 12)
Taylors College delivers the final 3 years of Australian secondary education (Year 10, Year 11 and Year 12) at their Sydney campus.

Taylors College high school programs are designed to meet the English language and academic needs needed to take the Higher School Certificate (New South Wales) examinations.

The curriculum and examinations are administered by the state of New South Wales.

Taylors English Language Preparation
The Taylors English Language Preparation program, delivered in 12-week terms, is designed to help international students gain the level of English language proficiency necessary for academic study.

It focuses on language studies, formal writing styles, note taking, assignment writing, intensive listening, and reading.

Upon completion of Taylors English Language Preparation, students do not need to take an IELTS test before they begin the high school or foundation programs.

Campuses
Taylors College campuses are located in Sydney and Auckland.
 
Taylors College Sydney is located in the eastern Sydney suburb of Waterloo and is housed in a modern building located close to the centre of Sydney.
Taylors College Auckland is located on Karangahapee Road in the heart of Auckland city.

Taylors College Perth closed in 2021. It was based on the University of Western Australia’s campus.

References

External links

 Taylors College official website

Private secondary schools in Perth, Western Australia
Private secondary schools in Sydney
Schools of English as a second or foreign language
Schools in Auckland
1920 establishments in Australia
Educational institutions established in 1920